Two Women is a 1947 Swedish drama film directed by Arnold Sjöstrand and starring Eva Dahlbeck, Cécile Ossbahr and Gunnar Björnstrand. It is a remake of the 1938 French film Women's Prison which itself was based on a novel by Francis Carco. It was entered into the 1947 Cannes Film Festival.

The film's sets were designed by the art director Bertil Duroj. It was shot at the Centrumateljéerna Studios in Stockholm and on location around the city including prison scenes at the Långholmen Prison.

Synopsis
After unjustly serving time in prison for murder, a young woman attempts to lead an honest life on her release.

Cast
 Eva Dahlbeck as Sonja Bergman
 Cécile Ossbahr as Cecilia Alling
 Gunnar Björnstrand as Bengt
 Georg Rydeberg as Henry Alling
 Arnold Sjöstrand as John Martins
 Marianne Löfgren as Helen Sinner
 Naima Wifstrand as Cecilia's Foster-Mother
 Arthur FIscher as Cecilia's Foster-Father
 Nils Hallberg as Nisse
 Lasse Krantz as Victor
 Linnéa Hillberg as Guard-lady at prison
 Torsten Hillberg as Constable
 Viveka Linder as Miss Gren
 Nils Ohlin as West
 Artur Rolén as Porter at hotel 
 Tord Stål as Count
 Ivar Wahlgren as Doctor

References

Bibliography
 Larsson, Mariah & Marklund, Anders. Swedish Film: An Introduction and Reader. Nordic Academic Press, 2010.

External links

1947 films
1947 drama films
Swedish drama films
1940s Swedish-language films
Swedish black-and-white films
Films directed by Arnold Sjöstrand
Remakes of French films
Films based on French novels
Films set in Stockholm
Films shot in Stockholm
1940s Swedish films